|
The Egypt national beach soccer team represents Egypt in international beach soccer competitions and is controlled by the Egyptian Football Association, the governing body for football in Egypt.

Current squad
Correct as of July 2009

 

Coach: Badr El Din Mahmoud

Achievements

 Africa Beach Soccer Cup of Nations Best: Runner-up (1)
 2022 

  Arab Beach Soccer Championship  Best: Winner (1)
 2014

 Beach Soccer Intercontinental Cup Best: Fourth Place (2)
 2015, 2018

 2019 Neom Beach Soccer Cup  Best: Runners-up (1)
 2019

Beach soccer at the  Mediterranean Beach Games Best: Runners-up (1)
 2015

Sharm El Sheikh International Championship  Best: Runners-up (1)
 2015

Casablanca Beach Soccer Cup : BSWW Tour  Best: Winner (1)
 2022

Muscat International Championship : BSWW Tour Best: Winner (1) 
 2010

El Jadida International league : BSWW Tour Best: Runners-up (1)
 2016

COSAFA Beach Soccer  Cup  Best: Runners-up (1)
 2022

External links
 Squad

African national beach soccer teams
Beach Soccer